Pluteus aethalus is a species of agaric fungus in the family Pluteaceae. It is found in Cuba. The species was originally named Agaricus aethalus by Miles Joseph Berkeley & Moses Ashley Curtis in 1869, and later transferred to the genus Pluteus by Pier Andrea Saccardo in 1887. It is classified in Pluteus section Celluloderma, subsection Mixtini.

See also
List of Pluteus species

References

External links

aethalus
Fungi described in 1869
Fungi of the Caribbean
Taxa named by Miles Joseph Berkeley